Garabet Ibrăileanu (May 23, 1871 – March 11, 1936) was a Romanian-Armenian literary critic and theorist, writer, translator, sociologist, University of Iași professor (1908–1934), and, together with Paul Bujor and Constantin Stere, for long main editor of the Viața Românească literary magazine between 1906 and 1930. He published many of his works under the pen name Cezar Vraja.

Biography 
Ibrăileanu was born into a family of Armenian origin, in Târgu Frumos, Iași County, and attended the Roman-Vodă High School in Roman. During the 1890s, he was attracted to Socialism, and began a collaboration with the left-wing press - periodicals such as Munca and Adevărul. He adopted part of the themes and goals expressed by the defunct Junimea, merging them with the ideas of Marxist thinker Constantin Dobrogeanu-Gherea, into a new form of Romanian populism, making it the main attribute of the magazine he led. He is remembered as the first mentor to such diverse figures as Mihail Sadoveanu, Ion Agârbiceanu, Ionel Teodoreanu, Gala Galaction, Octavian Goga, George Topîrceanu, and Tudor Arghezi.

In his first major essay (1908), Spiritul critic în cultura românească (roughly: "Selective Attitudes in Romanian Culture"), Ibrăileanu analysed the trends in Romanian literature from cca. 1840 to cca. 1880, trying to establish what had been the characteristics of original works. This is the first draft of his theory of selection, through which he determined the relationship between social context and artists' subjectivism (using it to explain why original artists had been ignored in favor of conformist ones of lesser talent). His thesis found its first major critic in modernist figure Eugen Lovinescu.

He expanded the idea in works of literary criticism that are still influential: in 1909 - Scriitori şi curente ("Writers and Trends"); in 1912 - Opera literară a d-lui Vlahuță ("Mr. Vlahuță's Literary Works"), a doctorate thesis that featured one of Ibrăileanu's most quoted chapters, Literatura și societatea ("Literature and Society"); in 1930 - Studii literare ("Literary Studies"), containing his other major writing, Creaţie și analiză ("Creation and Analysis"). He also authored a volume of aphorisms (1930), and a novel - Adela (1933).

Ibrăileanu died in Bucharest in 1936, and was buried at Eternitatea Cemetery in Iași. Denied admission to the Romanian Academy throughout his life, Garabet Ibrăileanu received posthumous membership in 1948.

Notes

Poporanists
Romanian literary critics
Romanian literary historians
20th-century Romanian novelists
Romanian male novelists
Romanian sociologists
Romanian translators
Members of the Romanian Academy elected posthumously
People from Târgu Frumos
Romanian people of Armenian descent
1871 births
1936 deaths
20th-century translators
20th-century Romanian male writers
Academic staff of Alexandru Ioan Cuza University
Burials at Eternitatea cemetery
Alexandru Ioan Cuza University alumni